"Woody Boogie" is an Italo disco song recorded and released by Italy-based act Baltimora. It was the group's second single, released in 1985, from the band's debut album Living in the Background, on which it features as fourth track. Two promotional videos were created for the single. The song notably features a synthesizer replaying cartoon character Woody Woodpecker’s signature laugh, which is incorporated into the chorus as well as other parts of the song.

Despite the promotion, the single failed to make any impact in the United Kingdom or United States unlike the previous hit single "Tarzan Boy". However, the single was a fair hit within Europe.

Music video
The music video features Jimmy McShane arriving to a record factory pushing a bike, changing into the factory uniform, and heading towards a group of workers. As he begins to place "Woody Boogie" records in a box, one of his superiors, accompanied by his assistant (played by the Baltimora's lyricist, Naimy Hackett), arrives, and begins to scold him. McShane becomes angered, and begins to dance. At this point the song's chorus begins to play. McShane and the rest of the workers (one of which is played by Baltimora vocalist/producer Maurizio Bassi) head into what appears to be a storage room and begin to dance until the end of the video, where McShane kisses Hackett, and the screen freezes and slowly fades to black.

Formats
7-inch single
"Woody Boogie" - 3:46
"Woody Boogie" (Instrumental) - 3:51

7-inch single (UK)
"Woody Boogie" - 3:37
"Woody Boogie" (Jumpin' Mix) - 3:46

12-inch single
"Woody Boogie" (Jumping Mix) - 5:50
"Woody Boogie" (Instrumental) - 4:35

12-inch single (UK)
"Woody Boogie" (Unknown Mix) - 5:52
"Woody Boogie" (Instrumental) - 4:36
"Woody Boogie" (7" Version) - 3:37

Personnel 
 Maurizio Bassi – producer, arranger
 Jurgen Koppers – mixing
 Paolo Mescoli – recording

Charts

References

1985 songs
1985 singles
Baltimora songs
Songs written by Maurizio Bassi
EMI Records singles